Yeliseyevichi is a rural locality (a selo) in Bryansky District, Bryansk Oblast, Russia. The population was 35 as of 2013.

Geography 
Yeliseyevichi is located 15 km southeast of Glinishchevo (the district's administrative centre) by road. Oktyabrskoye is the nearest rural locality.

References 

Rural localities in Bryansky District
Bryansky Uyezd